Oscar Manuel Collazo (born January 15, 1997) is a Puerto Rican professional boxer.

Amateur boxing career
During his seven-year amateur career, Collazo won five national amateur boxing titles, the bronze medal the 2017 Panamerican Championships and the gold medal at the 2019 Pan American Games.

Professional boxing career
Collazo made his professional debut as a light flyweight against Vicente Castro Cheneque on 15 February 2020. He won the fight by a third-round technical knockout. Collazo was next booked to face Kevin John Cruz Jusino on 5 December 2020. He won his second professional bout a round quicker than his first, as he won the fight by a second-round technical knockout.

Collazo moved up to flyweight for his next bout, against Francisco Bonilla on 25 March 2021, on the Amanda Serrano vs. Daniela Romina Bermúdez undercard. He won the fight by a career-first unanimous decision, with all three judges scoring the fight 60–54 in his favor. Collazo moved down to mini flyweight to face Pedro Villegas for the vacant WBO Latino minimumweight title on 3 December 2021. He won the fight by a third-round technical knockout.

Collazo faced the former WBO and WBA (Regular) mini-flyweight champion Vic Saludar in a WBA mini-flyweight title eliminator. The fight was booked for the undercard of the Javier Fortuna lightweight bout, which took place on July 16, 2022. Collazo won the fight by unanimous decision, with two scorecards of 116–112 and one scorecard of 118–110. Both fighters were knocked down in the sixth round, Saludar with a two-punch combination and Collazo with a right uppercut.

Collazo was expected to face the former WBO mini flyweight titlist Wilfredo Méndez in a WBO mini-flyweight title eliminator on January 28, 2023, on the undercard of the Alexis Rocha and Anthony Young welterweight bout, which took place at the YouTube Theater in Inglewood, California. Méndez was forced to withdraw from the bout on January 15, due to a back injury sustained in training. He was replaced by Yudel Reyes, who stepped in on two-week's notice. Collazo stopped his opponent with a left hook at the 2:59 minute mark of the fifth round. He had knocked Reyes down with a right hook in the previous round.

On January 30, 2023, the WBO ordered their mini-flyweight champion Melvin Jerusalem make a mandatory title defense against Collazo. As the they failed to reach a deal within the 30-day negotiation period, the sanctioning body scheduled a purse bid for February 23. It was declared deserted for failure to comply with purse bid terms, rescheduled for February 27, and eventually won by Golden Boy Promotions and Cotto Promotions with a bid of $152,000.

Professional boxing record

References

1997 births
Living people
American male boxers
Boxers from Newark, New Jersey
Mini-flyweight boxers
Light-flyweight boxers
Flyweight boxers
Southpaw boxers
Puerto Rican male boxers
Pan American Games gold medalists for Puerto Rico
Pan American Games medalists in boxing
Boxers at the 2019 Pan American Games
Medalists at the 2019 Pan American Games